Asha de Vos (Sinhala:ආශා ඩි වොස් (born 1979) is a Sri Lankan marine biologist, ocean educator and pioneer of blue whale research within the northern Indian Ocean. She is known for her Blue Whale Project. She is a Senior TED Fellow and was chosen for a BBC 100 Women award in 2018. She is a National Geographic 2016 Emerging Explorer Grantee.

Life and career
De Vos was born in 1979 in Sri Lanka. When she was six-years-old her parents would bring her second-hand National Geographic magazines. She would look through the pages and "imagine that that would be me one day – going places where no-one else would ever go and seeing things no-one else would ever see", inspiring her to dream of being an "adventure-scientist".

De Vos's primary education was at Ladies’ College, Colombo and after completing her primary education followed by the Colombo International School, she moved to Scotland for her undergraduate studies in marine and environmental biology at the University of St. Andrews. She went on to gain her masters in integrative bio-sciences at the University of Oxford and a PhD from the University of Western Australia.

De Vos is the first and only Sri Lankan to gain a PhD in marine mammal research.

De Vos had served as a senior programme officer in the marine and coastal unit of the International Union for Conservation of Nature. She founded the Sri Lankan Blue Whale Project in 2008, which forms the first long-term study on blue whales within the northern Indian Ocean. She discovered through her research that an unrecognized unique population of blue whales, previously thought to migrate every year, stayed in waters near Sri Lanka year round.

Due to de Vos's research, the International Whaling Commission has designated Sri Lankan blue whales as a species in urgent need of conservation research and has started collaborating with the Sri Lankan government on whale ship-strikes.

De Vos is an invited member of the IUCN Species Survival Commission's Cetacean Specialist Group. She was a post-doctoral scholar at the University of California Santa Cruz and a guest blogger for National Geographic.

She is the founder and director of the non-profit Oceanswell, Sri Lanka's first marine conservation research and education organization.

De Vos believes that the health and future of coastlines depends on local people. She argues that "parachute science", the practice of Western scientists collecting data in developing countries and then leaving without training or investing in the locals or region, is unsustainable and cripples conservation efforts.

De Vos has also stated that women should define themselves by their capacity and not let their gender limit their potential.

De Vos is a TED Senior Fellow, a Duke University Global Fellow in Marine Conservation and has been selected as a Young Global Leader by the World Economic Forum.

In 2013, she received the President's Award for Scientific Publications.

In 2015, she was a Marine Conservation Action Fund Fellow and in 2016 she became a Pew Marine Fellow.

In 2018, she received the WINGS WorldQuest Women of Discovery Sea Award.

On 26 May 2018, she was awarded the Golden alumni award in the Professional Achievement category at the first edition of the British Council Golden Alumni awards. Later in the year she joined the BBC 100 Women list.

On 27 March 2019, de Vos was celebrated as one 12 Women Changemakers by the Sri Lanka parliament.

In 2020, de Vos was named Sea Hero of the Year by Scuba Diving magazine.

See also 
 Timeline of women in science

References

External links

Oceanswell
Marine Conservation Action Fund

1979 births
Living people
Women marine biologists
Sri Lankan women scientists
Alumni of Ladies' College, Colombo
Alumni of the University of Oxford
Alumni of the University of St Andrews
University of Western Australia alumni
Sri Lankan zoologists
Sri Lankan underwater divers
BBC 100 Women
Sri Lankan environmentalists
Sri Lankan women environmentalists
21st-century zoologists
21st-century women scientists